Dan Ferrigno (born March 24, 1953) is an American football coach and former player.  He is currently an offensive analyst at Washington State University, a position he has held since 2020.  Ferrigno is a member of the San Francisco Prep Hall of Fame. During his playing career, he set records at San Francisco State University and Archbishop Riordan High School in San Francisco, California.

References

External links
 Cal Poly profile
 San Jose State profile
 Michigan profile

1953 births
Living people
American football wide receivers
California Golden Bears football coaches
Coaches of American football from California
High school football coaches in California
Oregon Ducks football coaches
Oregon State Beavers football coaches
Pacific Tigers football coaches
Players of American football from San Francisco
San Francisco State Gators football coaches
San Francisco State Gators football players
San Jose State Spartans football coaches
USC Trojans football coaches
Western Michigan Broncos football coaches
Washington State Cougars football coaches